Walter J. Light (1927–1979) was an American timpanist, percussionist, and drummaker. At the age of 16, he was appointed to a percussion position in the Denver Symphony Orchestra, joining his father, Walter E. Light, who was the timpanist. He began a 27-year stint as principal timpanist after his father's death in 1952.

Dissatisfied with the instruments available to him post–World War II, he took up drum building in order to recreate the Dresden-style timpani built in Germany before the war. Eventually, other timpanists asked Light to build drums for them. In 1950, he formed the American Drum Manufacturing Company, which still builds custom timpani to this day.

References 
 "Biography: Walter Light". American Drum Manufacturing Co. Retrieved February 6, 2005.

American percussionists
1927 births
1979 deaths